Gerhard August Honckeny (also spelt Honkeny) (1724–1805) was a German botanist, and an  near Prenzlau. He is best known for his Synopsis Plantarum Germaniæ, and is referred to by the standard abbreviation Honck. in botanical works. He is commemorated in the genus name Honckenya.

References

1724 births
1805 deaths
18th-century German botanists
People from Prenzlau
Botanists with author abbreviations